Amy Winehouse at the BBC is a posthumous live album by English singer and songwriter Amy Winehouse. It was released on 12 November 2012 by Universal Music Group. The album, along with Winehouse's previous record Lioness: Hidden Treasures, was released in aid of the Amy Winehouse Foundation. It features live songs performed by Winehouse at BBC specials during 2004 to 2009.

The album was re-issued on vinyl and CD and added to digital retailers and streaming platforms on 7 May 2021. The new collection consists of the original album, as well as A Tribute to Amy Winehouse by Jools Holland and Amy Winehouse – BBC One Sessions Live at Porchester Hall. The latter two were previously included as DVDs in the original deluxe box set, but were made available in audio form for the first time.

Reception

The album was released to moderately positive critical reviews, with aggregator Metacritic assigning a positive review score of 64%, indicating generally favourable reception. Gary Mulholland of the BBC wrote that the set "stands as an alternative Best Of, showcasing her skills as a live performer."

Track listing

Deluxe box set
In addition to the live album, a box set was released on 12 November 2012. It features the album along with three extra DVDs: Arena: Amy Winehouse – The Day She Came to Dingle (which is also featured in the two-disc version of the album), A Tribute to Amy Winehouse by Jools Holland and Amy Winehouse – BBC One Sessions Live at Porchester Hall.

Charts and certifications

Weekly charts

Certifications

Release history

References

External links

2012 live albums
2012 video albums
Amy Winehouse live albums
Amy Winehouse video albums
BBC Radio recordings
Island Records live albums
Island Records video albums
Live albums published posthumously
Live video albums
Universal Music Group live albums
Universal Music Group video albums
Video albums published posthumously